Michel Macedo Rocha Machado (born 15 February 1990) is a Brazilian footballer who plays as a right back for Ceará.

Career

Early career
Michel was born in Rio de Janeiro. He began his career in Soft Lazer (a futsal academy), and joined Botafogo's youth setup in 1997, aged seven. After playing for Botafogo's futsal club, he joined the football team as a right winger, but was reconverted to full-back in the process.

After impressing in a match against Flamengo in 2005, Macedo joined the latter shortly after. He was regarded as one of the best youth prospects during his time at Estádio da Gávea.

Almería
On 23 June 2008, Macedo moved to La Liga strugglers UD Almería, in a seven-year contract. He was awarded the #16 jersey.

Macedo made his debut for the Andalusians on 16 November, in a 2–1 home win against RCD Mallorca, after came off the bench to replace Juanma Ortiz in the 87th minute. His first start came on 10 May of the following year, in a 3–1 success against Sporting de Gijón also at the Estadio de los Juegos Mediterráneos; it were his two only appearances of the campaign, which the rojiblancos eventually finished 11th.

On 20 September, Macedo scored his first goal as a professional, netting the winner against Getafe CF. He was an undisputed starter during the following two seasons, but was later challenged by new signing Rafita in 2011–12, with the latter appearing in 35 matches while the former only appeared in 22, and was subsequently loaned to Atlético Mineiro in the summer.

Atlético Mineiro (loan)
On 19 July 2012, Macedo was loaned to Clube Atlético Mineiro. He expressed his desire to return to his country, after having some personal problems in Spain.

Macedo only made his league debut almost a year later, in a 0-1 away defeat against Santos FC on 13 June 2013; late in the month, the deal was renewed for another year. He finished the campaign with 16 appearances, including 72 minutes in the Copa Libertadores Final, a 2–0 home win against Olimpia, but acted mainly as a backup to Marcos Rocha.

On 7 May 2014 Macedo was released by Galo, after being deemed surplus to requirements by new manager Levir Culpi.

Return to Almería
On 9 July 2014 Macedo returned to Almería, being immediately assigned to the first-team squad. He subsequently renewed his link for a further year on the 21st.

On 23 August 2014 Macedo played his first match after his return, starting in a 1–1 home draw against RCD Espanyol.

Las Palmas
On 15 July 2016, Macedo signed a two-year deal with UD Las Palmas in the first division.

Club statistics

Honours
Atlético Mineiro
Campeonato Mineiro: 2013
Copa Libertadores: 2013

Corinthians
Campeonato Paulista: 2019

References

External links

1990 births
Living people
Footballers from Rio de Janeiro (city)
Brazilian footballers
Association football defenders
Campeonato Brasileiro Série A players
Clube Atlético Mineiro players
Sport Club Corinthians Paulista players
Esporte Clube Juventude players
Ceará Sporting Club players
La Liga players
Segunda División players
UD Almería players
UD Las Palmas players
Brazilian expatriate footballers
Brazilian expatriate sportspeople in Spain
Expatriate footballers in Spain